Grafrath station is a railway station in the municipality of Grafrath, located in the Fürstenfeldbruck district in Bavaria, Germany.

References

Railway stations in Bavaria
Buildings and structures in Fürstenfeldbruck (district)
Railway stations in Germany opened in 1873